Abu Mohammed Abdallah al-Ghazwani (died in 1529) was a Sufi saint from Morocco in the tradition of al-Jazuli and ash-Shadhili. He was the successor of Abdelaziz al-Tebaa.  Some two hundred years after his death he became one of the Sabaatou rijales, the seven saints of Marrakesh, an institution founded by al-Yusi at the instigation of sultan Moulay Ismael (1672–1727).
Abdallah al-Ghazwani wrote on the idea of the Tariqa Muhammadiyya. Al-Ghazwani combined Ibn Arabi’s and al-Jili’s ideas of the saint's absorption (or annihilation) in the Muslim essence (dhat) with an emphasis on the necessity of the saint's involvement in society. Al-Ghazwani was also renowned for his skill in sinking wells and constructing channels.

Notes

References
Hasan Jallab, Abu Muhammad Abdullah Al Ghazwani, Morocco: Imprimerie et Papeterie Nationale, 2005 (Biography of  Al Ghazwani) 

Moroccan Sufi writers
Year of birth unknown
1529 deaths
People from Marrakesh
16th-century Moroccan people